Virginia Christian (August 15, 1895 – August 16, 1912) was the first female criminal executed in the 20th century in the state of Virginia, and a juvenile offender executed in the United States. She was also the only female juvenile executed by electric chair and, to date, the last female criminal executed in the electric chair by the Commonwealth of Virginia. She was the last female criminal executed by the Commonwealth until Thursday, September 23, 2010, when Teresa Lewis became the first female criminal in nearly a century to be executed in the US state of Virginia.

Christian, a black maid, was convicted of the murder of her employer Ida Belote, a 72-year-old white woman, in her home at Hampton on March 18, 1912. Shortly after she was arrested, it is said she confessed that she hit Belote, but that she had never intended to kill her.

Incident
Belote is alleged to have mistreated and abused Christian, and in mid- March 1912, an argument ensued between the two in which Belote accused Christian of stealing a locket and a skirt. Belote hit Christian with a cuspidor, commonly called a 'spittoon'. The altercation escalated when Christian and Belote ran for two broom handles Belote used to prop up her bedroom windows. Christian grabbed one of the broom handles and struck Belote on the forehead. In an attempt to stifle Belote's screams, Christian stuffed a towel down Belote's throat, and the woman died by suffocation.

When Christian left the house, she stole Belote's purse with some money and a ring. One newspaper reported that police found Belote's body "laying face down in a pool of blood, and her head was horribly mutilated and a towel was stuffed into her mouth and throat".

Trial and execution
Police soon arrested Christian, and during questioning, she admitted to hitting Belote but was shocked that Belote was dead. Christian claimed she had no intent to kill Belote. With a lynch mob looming in the background, an Elizabeth City County Court tried and convicted Christian for murder and the trial judge sentenced her to death in the state's electric chair. One day after her 17th birthday in August 1912, a short five months after the crime, Virginia authorities executed Christian at the state penitentiary in Richmond.

Governor William Hodges Mann, who was also a Confederate veteran, declined to commute the death sentence, despite a plea from Virginia's mother, Charlotte Christian, who wrote to him:

 My dear, Mr Governor
 Please for give me for Bowing low to write you a few lines: I am the mother of Virginiany Christian. I have been pairalized for mor then three years and I could not and Look after Gennie as I wants too. I know she dun an awful weaked thing when she kill Miss Belote and I hear that the people at the penetintry wants to kill her but I is praying night and day on my knees to God that he will soften your heart so that She may spend the rest of her days in prison. they say that the whole thing is in yours Hands and I know  if you will onely save my child who is little over sixteen years old God will Bless you for ever … If I was able to come to see you I could splain things to you better but I cant do nothing but pray to God and ask him to help you to simpithise with me and my truble
 I am your most umble subgeck,
 Charlotte Christian.

After the governor declined this request, Christian took her seat in the electric chair, where she was electrocuted in the state prison in Richmond. She was 17 years old. The paper reported that her body was to be turned over to the state medical school, because her parents did not have the money to transport the body from Richmond.

See also
 Capital punishment for juveniles in the United States
 Hannah Ocuish
 Mary (slave)
 George Stinney
 James Arcene
 Forsaken, a historical novel written about Christian

References

External links
 
 
 Forsaken: The Digital Bibliography at Virginia Memory
 

1895 births
1912 deaths
People from Hampton, Virginia
People executed by Virginia by electric chair
American people executed for murder
Executed children
Executed American women
American female murderers
People convicted of murder by Virginia
Executed African-American people
Executed people from Virginia
Juvenile offenders executed by the United States
20th-century executions of American people